Sir Henry Lyttelton, 2nd Baronet (1624 – 24 June 1693) was an English politician and member of the Lyttelton family. He was a Royalist officer during the English Civil War. After the Restoration, from 1678 to 1679 he sat in the House of Commons.

Biography
Lyttelton was the eldest surviving son of Sir Thomas Lyttelton, 1st Baronet (1593–1650), from whom he inherited the family estates in Frankley, Halesowen, Hagley, and Upper Arley in 1649. He joined the Royalist forces at the Battle of Worcester in 1651, where they were routed by the Parliamentarians, and consequentially spent 17 months imprisoned in the Tower of London. He was nevertheless appointed High Sheriff of Worcestershire for 1654–1656.

He was elected member of parliament for Lichfield in 1678 and sat until 1679.

Family
Lyttelton married twice: firstly Philadelphia, the daughter and co-heiress of the Hon. Thomas Carey, groom of the bedchamber to Charles I and secondly Lady Elizabeth Newport, daughter of Francis Newport, 1st Earl of Bradford. He had no male issue and was succeeded in the baronetcy by his brother.

Notes

References

Burkes Peerage and Baronetage (1939)

1624 births
1693 deaths
Baronets in the Baronetage of England
Prisoners in the Tower of London
High Sheriffs of Worcestershire
Henry
English MPs 1661–1679
English MPs 1679
Cavaliers